was a railway station in the city of Naganohara, Gunma, Japan, operated by the private railway operating company Kusakaru Electric Railway [ja].

Overview 
On 15 June 1918, this station was established as Jizogawa Station. In 1927, this station was renamed Kita-Karuizawa Station from Jizogawa Station. This station was closed on 25 April 1960 since stations in between Joshu-Mihara Station and Shin-Karuizawa Station of Kusakaru Electric Railway Line was discontinued due to multiple disasters by typhoon.

Chronicle 
On 15 June 1918 - Jizogawa Station was established as an irregular station of Kusatsu Electric Railway
On 22 September 1919 - changed to a regular station
On 25 April 1960 - Abolition
On 29 November 2006 - This station building was registered as Tangible Cultural Property (Japan)

Surrounding area 
Asama Farm is located near this station. Mount Asama is visible to the south-west from this station.
 Japan National Route 146
Mt. Asama Stone Magma Park (Onioshidashi Park)

Others
On 29 November 2006, this station building was registered as Tangible Cultural Property (Japan) by Agency of Cultural Affairs. Presently, this building is opened for free during the summer.

Adjacent stations 
 Kusakaru Electric Railway
 Yuzawa Station - kita-Karuizawa Station - Agatsuma Station

Bus routes
The bus terminal is located in front of the former station building.
Kusakaru Kotsu
For Karuizawa Station
For Naganohara-Kusatsuguchi Station
For Kusatsu Onsen Bus Terminal via Haneo Station
Tokyu Bus, Seibu Bus and Keio Bus
For Shibuya Station and Tama Plaza Station or Futako-Tamagawa Station

See also 
Tokyu Corporation (Kusakaru Kotsu was a subsidiary company)
Prince Hotel (Mt. Asama Magma Park is operated by this company)
Kusatsu Onsen Station
Karuizawa Station

References

External links 

 Station building - Kita-Karuizawa Tourist Association
 Station
 Welcome to Naganohara

Railway stations in Japan opened in 1918
Railway stations in Gunma Prefecture
Naganohara, Gunma